There are at least 63 named mountains in Meagher County, Montana.
 Avalanche Butte, el. 
 Bald Hills, el. 
 Battle Mountain, el. 
 Bear Mountain, el. 
 Beartrap Peak, el. 
 Berkins Butte, el. 
 Billie Butte, el. 
 Black Butte, el. 
 Black Butte Mountain, el. 
 Butler Hill, el. 
 Castle Mountain, el. 
 Clay Butte, el. 
 Comb Butte, el. 
 Coxcombe Butte, el. 
 Daisy Peak, el. 
 Davey Butte, el. 
 Desolation Peak, el. 
 Devils Footstool, el. 
 Elk Peak, el. 
 Fort Gay Hill, el. 
 Goat Mountain, el. 
 Gordon Butte, el. 
 Grassy Mountain, el. 
 Green Mountain, el. 
 Green Mountain, el. 
 Hoover Mountain, el. 
 Horse Butte, el. 
 Iron Butte, el. 
 Iron Mountain, el. 
 Kings Hill, el. 
 Lebo Peak, el. 
 Loco Mountain, el. 
 Mizpah Peak, el. 
 Monument Peak, el. 
 Moose Mountain, el. 
 Mount Elmo, el. 
 Mount High, el. 
 Mount Howe, el. 
 Mount Vesuvius, el. 
 Muddy Mountain, el. 
 Old Baldy, el. 
 Porphyry Peak, el. 
 Punk Mountain, el. 
 Quail Hill, el. 
 Rees Hills, el. 
 Reservation Mountain, el. 
 Reynolds Mountain, el. 
 Scab Rock Mountain, el. 
 Sheep Mountain, el. 
 Sky Peak, el. 
 Smoky Mountain, el. 
 Songster Butte, el. 
 Strawberry Butte, el. 
 Target Rock, el. 
 Taylor Hills, el. 
 Virginia Peak, el. 
 Volcano Butte, el. 
 Wapiti Peak, el. 
 Williams Mountain, el. 
 Willow Peak, el. 
 Wolf Hill, el. 
 Woodchuck Mountain, el. 
 Woods Mountain, el.

See also
 List of mountains in Montana
 List of mountain ranges in Montana

Notes

Landforms of Meagher County, Montana
Meagher